The Haṭha Yoga Pradīpikā ( or Light on Hatha Yoga) is a classic fifteenth-century Sanskrit manual on haṭha yoga, written by Svātmārāma, who connects the teaching's lineage to Matsyendranath of the Nathas. It is among the most influential surviving texts on haṭha yoga, being one of the three classic texts alongside the Gheranda Samhita and the Shiva Samhita.

More recently, eight works of early hatha yoga that may have contributed to the Hatha Yoga Pradipika have been identified.

Title and composition

Different manuscripts offer different titles for the text, including Haṭhayogapradīpikā, Haṭhapradīpikā, Haṭhapradī, and Hath-Pradipika. It was composed by Svātmārāma in the 15th century as a compilation of the earlier haṭha yoga texts. Svātmārāma incorporates older Sanskrit concepts into his synthesis. He introduces his system as a preparatory stage for physical purification before higher meditation or Raja Yoga.

Summary

The Hatha Yoga Pradīpikā lists thirty-five earlier Haṭha Yoga masters (siddhas), including Ādi Nātha, Matsyendranāth and Gorakṣanāth.  The work consists of 389 shlokas (verses) in four chapters that describe topics including purification (Sanskrit: ṣaṭkarma),  posture (āsana), breath control (prāṇāyāma), spiritual centres in the body (chakra), kuṇḍalinī, energetic locks (bandha), energy (prāṇa), channels of the subtle body (nāḍī), and energetic seals (mudrā).

 Chapter 1 deals with setting the proper environment for yoga, the ethical duties of a yogi, and the asanas.
 Chapter 2 deals with pranayama and the satkarmas.
 Chapter 3 discusses the mudras and their benefits.
 Chapter 4 deals with meditation and samadhi as a journey of personal spiritual growth.

It runs in the line of Hindu yoga (as opposed to the Buddhist and Jain traditions) and is dedicated to The First Lord (Ādi Nātha), one of the names of Lord Śiva (the Hindu god of destruction and renewal). He is described in several Nāth texts as having imparted the secret of haṭha yoga to his divine consort Pārvatī.

Mechanisms 

The Hatha Yoga Pradipika presents two contradictory models of how Hatha Yoga may lead to immortality (moksha), both culled from other texts, without attempting to harmonise them. 

The earlier model involves the manipulation of Bindu; it drips continually from the moon centre in the head, falling to its destruction either in the digestive fire of the belly (the sun centre), or to be ejaculated as semen, with which it was identified. The loss of Bindu causes progressive weakening and ultimately death. In this model, Bindu is to be conserved, and the various mudras act to block its passage down the Sushumna nadi, the central channel of the subtle body.

The later model involves the stimulation of Kundalini, visualised as a small serpent coiled around the base of the Sushumna nadi. In this model, the mudras serve to unblock the channel, allowing Kundalini to rise. When Kundalini finally reaches the top at the Sahasrara chakra, the thousand-petalled lotus, the store of Amrita, the nectar of immortality stored in the head, is released. The Amrita then floods down through the body, rendering it immortal.

Modern research

The Hatha Yoga Pradipika is the hatha yoga text that has historically been studied within yoga teacher training programmes, alongside texts on classical yoga such as Patanjali's Yoga Sutras. In the twenty-first century, research on the history of yoga has led to a more developed understanding of hatha yoga's origins.

James Mallinson has studied the origins of hatha yoga in classic yoga texts such as the Khecarīvidyā. He has identified eight works of early hatha yoga that may have contributed to its official formation in the Hatha Yoga Pradipika. This has stimulated further research into understanding the formation of hatha yoga.

Jason Birch has investigated the role of the Hatha Yoga Pradīpikā in popularizing an interpretation of the Sanskrit word haṭha. The text drew from classic texts on different systems of yoga, and Svātmārāma grouped what he had found under the generic term "haṭha yoga". Examining Buddhist tantric commentaries and earlier medieval yoga texts, Birch found that the adverbial uses of the word suggested that it meant "force", rather than "the metaphysical explanation proposed in the 14th century Yogabīja of uniting the sun (ha) and moon (ṭha)".

References

Sources

External links

 Iyangar et al 1972 Translation with Jyotsnā commentary
 Sanskrit text and translation of Pancham Sinh edition at sacred-texts.com 
 Hatha Yoga Pradipika Pancham Sinh edition from LibriPass  
 Sample of new translation by Brian Akers
 2003 translation with Jyotsnā commentary
 Light on Haṭha Yoga project: a critical edition and translation, 2021

Hindu texts
Sanskrit texts
15th-century Indian books
Hatha yoga texts